Blank Slate Books (BSB) is a publishing company based in the UK.  It publishes primarily comic books, graphic novels and comic strip collections, with an emphasis on new work by British artists and translated work by European artists.  The books it publishes are noted for their "indie-friendly" content, and are frequently by small press artists whose initial work is self-published.  The name of the company is a pun on "drawing" or "writing" on a blackboard.

BSB is currently one of the few dedicated original comics and graphic novel publishers in the UK.

History
Blank Slate Books (BSB) was founded in 2008 by Kenny Penman and a partner. Penman was inspired by Fantagraphics Books of Seattle, WA. to publish books in the United Kingdom that would do for artists in Britain what Fantagraphics was doing in the USA, championing the independent. alternative creators who were not working in Superhero or other ‘mainstream’ commercial comics genres. Penman is co-director of Forbidden Planet International so has plenty of experience with the comics industry. He saw the mission of BSB as "supporting home-grown talent" and providing an essential outlet for work that might not be seen elsewhere. 
He was primarily motivated to begin the company after encountering the work of Oliver East who has no real precedents in UK comics. The publication of Trains Are Mint by East was BSB's first release in 2008 and was critically acclaimed with an Ignatz nomination following soon after publication.

Other notable releases were Psychiatric Tales by Darryl Cunningham, another non-genre work which was featured on Radio 4, in many newspaper articles and eventually republished in the USA. The "collective graphic novel" Nelson, edited by Rob Davis and Woodrow Phoenix, was an experiment that became The Observer newspaper's Graphic Novel of The Month, November 2011. The Times newspaper awarded it Best Graphic Novel of 2011, it was nominated for an Eisner Award and was voted Book of The Year in the British Comic Awards 2012.

Penman's other mission was to introduce titles from European countries to the UK that otherwise might not be seen. He has focused primarily upon German titles by creators such as Mawil, Line Hoven, and Ule Osterle who are stars in Germany but little known in the UK. BSB currently publishes six to eight books a year. In 2012 Woodrow Phoenix, himself an acclaimed author of graphic novels, became art director of the company and now supervises BSB's design and production.

Titles

Graphic Novels
Psychiatric Tales by Darryl Cunningham
Spleenal  by Nigel Auchterlounie
Weak As I Am  by Nigel Auchterlounie 
Berlin And That by Oliver East
Trains Are ... Mint by Oliver East
Proper Go Well High by Oliver East
’’Swear Down by Oliver EastGirl and the Gorilla, The by Madéleine FloresPeepholes by Laurie J. Proud Death & The Girls by Donya ToddPlaying Out by Jim MedwayTake Away by Lizz LunneyDinopopolous by Nick EdwardsMy Skateboard Life  by Ed SyderSurvivalist, The by Box BrownSuitcase, The by Dan BerryOrson Welles: Special Agent!  by Gordon Rennie & Woodrow PhoenixKochi Wanaba by Jamie SmartA Long Day Of Mr. James-Teacher by James Harvey

Collections and AnthologiesNelson by Rob Davis and Woodrow PhoenixHugo Tate by Nick AbadzisAlby Figgs by Warren PleeceUncle Bob Adventures by Darryl CunninghamAccidental Salad, The by Joe DecieListening Agent, The by Joe Decie

TranslationsDepartures  by Pierre MaurelLuchadoras by Peggy Adam Coney Island Baby by Nine AnticoSleepyheads by Randall C. Hector Umbra by Uli OesterleLove Looks Away by Line HovenSparky O’Hare by Mawil The Band by Mawil We Can Still Be Friends  by Mawil Home & Away  by Mawil

Other BooksFelt Mistress: Creature Couture '' by Woodrow Phoenix

References

External links
 BSB homepage
  Blog of publisher Kenny Penman
 "A collaboration between 54 British comic artists has produced a surprisingly cohesive and heartfelt novel" by Rachel Cooke, The Observer (18 November 2011) 
 |title=Blank Slate Blog
 "Graphic novel of the month" 
  My favourite medical graphic novels by Cian O'Luanaigh (19 July 2010)
 "The talking penguin's guide to climate change" by Killian Fox, The Observer (22 April 2012)

Comics based on fiction
Comic book publishing companies of the United Kingdom
British graphic novels
Privately held companies of the United Kingdom